WJYL-CD (channel 16) is a low-powered, Class A religious television station licensed to Clarksville, Indiana, United States, serving the Louisville, Kentucky market as an affiliate of the Trinity Broadcasting Network (TBN). Owned by Dominion Media (an arm of the Celebration Harvest Church), the station maintains studios on Potters Lane in Clarksville and a transmitter in rural northeastern Floyd County, Indiana (northeast of Floyds Knobs).

History
The station was founded in 1986 as W05BA, originally broadcasting on VHF channel 5. The calls were modified to W05BE in 1987; in 2002, it received a lettered callsign as WVHF-LP and moved to UHF channel 45. The station obtained Class A license status in 2004, becoming WVHF-CA. In 2008, its calls were changed to WNDA-CA, before switching again to WJYL-CA in 2009 (what is now WWJS-CD formerly used the WJYL-CA call letters from 2002 to 2009, and the WNDA-CA calls from 2009 to 2010). The station flash-cut its digital signal into operation on UHF channel 16 in February 2009. The station changed its call sign to WWWJ-CD on August 10, 2017, and back to WJYL-CD on September 27, 2017.

At one time, WJYL-CD operated a translator, W65CX, broadcasting near Elizabethtown, Kentucky.

As W05BE, the station was featured in the April 1994 edition of Popular Communications magazine, in a feature about low-power broadcasting. At that time, the station called itself "WCTV".

Digital television

Digital channels
The station's digital signal is multiplexed:

Previous logo

References

External links
WJYL-CD official website

Trinity Broadcasting Network affiliates
Television channels and stations established in 1986
JYL-CD
Low-power television stations in the United States
1986 establishments in Indiana
Clarksville, Indiana